Param Vir Chakra is a 1995 Bollywood war action film directed and written by Major Ashok Kaul. It stars Saeed Jaffrey, Kulbhushan Kharbanda and Hema Malini. The film premiered on 31 March 1995 in Mumbai.

At the 42nd National Film Awards of 1994, veteran cinematographer Radhu Karmakar, who died in 1993, was posthumously given a Special Jury Award for the film.

Cast
Hema Malini as Akash's Mother
Salim Shaikh  as  Air Force Officer Akash)
Rajeshwari Sachdev as Radha
Navin Nischol  as Radha's Father
Saeed Jaffrey as  Naval Officer
Kulbhushan Kharbanda as Army Officer
Abhijeet Sengupta  as  Naval Officer Ravi
Rajesh Shringarpure  as  Army Officer Arun
Reema Lagoo  as  Arun's Mother
Raghubir Yadav as student 
Aashish Kaul

Soundtrack

References

External links
 
 
 

1990s Hindi-language films
1995 films
1990s action war films
Indian action war films
Indian Army in films